Peje may refer to:

 PEJE, Partnership for Excellence in Jewish Education
 Pejë, or Peć, a city in Kosovo
 Peje Chiefdom, a chiefdom of Pujehun District, Sierra Leone
 El Peje, nickname of Andrés Manuel López Obrador (born 1953), Mexican president

See also